James B. Walker (1812–1877) was a Michigan politician.

Early life
Walker was born in 1812 in Locke, Cayuga County, New York.  He came to Flint, Michigan in 1836 and began working in as a clerk in Beach & Wesson dry goods store. Later, H.M. Henderson's dry goods store employed him. From 1838 to 1842, Walker operated a mercantile business on the north side of the Flint River. He building and ran a store at the corner of Kearsley and Saginaw streets from 1842 to 1858.

Political life
As the governor's appointed state resident trustee, he was in charge of deaf, dumb and blind asylum's construction and continued as a trustee of the asylum from 1858 to 1873.  He was elected as mayor of the City of Flint in 1870 serving a single 1-year term.  The first pavement on Saginaw Street was laid during his term as Mayor.

Post-Political life
In 1872, Walker was the first president and director of the Genesee Savings Bank. Walker died in Flint, 1877.

References

Mayors of Flint, Michigan
1812 births
1877 deaths
American bank presidents
19th-century American politicians
19th-century American businesspeople